The Crash is a 1928 American silent drama film directed by Edward F. Cline and starring Milton Sills, Thelma Todd and Wade Boteler.

Cast
 Milton Sills as Jim Flannagan 
 Thelma Todd as Daisy McQueen 
 Wade Boteler as Pat Regan 
 William Demarest as Louie 
 Fred Warren as Corbett 
 Sylvia Ashton as Mrs. Carleton 
 DeWitt Jennings as Supt. Carleton

References

Bibliography
 Munden, Kenneth White. The American Film Institute Catalog of Motion Pictures Produced in the United States, Part 1. University of California Press, 1997.

External links

1928 films
1928 drama films
Silent American drama films
Films directed by Edward F. Cline
American silent feature films
1920s English-language films
American black-and-white films
First National Pictures films
1920s American films